State Route 279 (SR 279) is a  east–west state highway in the southern portion of the U.S. state of Ohio.

Route description
SR 279 travels through the southern portion of Jackson County and a very small portion of western Gallia County.  There are no sections of SR 279 that are included as a part of the National Highway System (NHS).  The NHS is a network of highways identified as being most important for the economy, mobility and defense of the country.

History
The SR 279 designation was applied in 1930.  Originally, the highway was routed along much its present easternmost segment, running from Oak Hill to Centerville, which at the time was known as Thurman.  In 1939, SR 279 was extended west of Oak Hill along a previously un-numbered roadway into southwestern Jackson County to its present terminus at SR 139.

Major intersections

References

279
279
279